KIGN (101.9 FM, "King FM") is a radio station broadcasting a classic rock format. Licensed to Burns, Wyoming, United States, the station serves the Cheyenne area. The station is currently owned by Townsquare Media.

History
The station was assigned the call sign KMUS-FM on 1990-07-13. On 2002-06-03, the station changed its call sign to the current KIGN.

References

External links
Official Website
Live Stream

IGN
Radio stations established in 1990
Classic rock radio stations in the United States
1990 establishments in Wyoming
Townsquare Media radio stations